The 2018 European 10,000m Cup take place on May 19, 2018. The races took place on Parliament Hill Athletics Track in London, Great Britain. The event was held together with the annual Night of the 10,000m PB's meeting.

Medallists

Race results

Men's

Women's

* Athletes who competed in the Night of the 10,000m PBs but were not entered for the European Cup. The results of these athletes were not counted towards the final team score.

Medal table

References

External links
 Official website
 Results at EAA
 Results at the Power of 10

European Cup 10,000m
European Cup 10,000m
Sports competitions in London
International sports competitions in London
Athletics in the United Kingdom
European 10,000m Cup
European 10,000m Cup